The men's 200 metre breaststroke competition at the 1997 Pan Pacific Swimming Championships took place on August 13 at the NISHI Civic Pool.  The last champion was Akira Hayashi of Japan.

This race consisted of four lengths of the pool, all in breaststroke.

Records
Prior to this competition, the existing world and Pan Pacific records were as follows:

Results
All times are in minutes and seconds.

Heats
The first round was held on August 13.

B Final
The B final was held on August 13.

A Final
The A final was held on August 13.

References

1997 Pan Pacific Swimming Championships